The Keelung River is a river in northern Taiwan.

The Keelung River originates in the mountains west-northwest of the town of Jingtong in Pingxi District, New Taipei City, flows down to a rift valley and then flows ENE to Sandiaoling. Then it flows northward to a point between Jiufen and Keelung City, and then heads back in a general WSW direction to Taipei, where it joins the Tamsui River and flows out to sea. The land around the Keelung river was rich in gold and coal, and many areas were mined.

Geology
Park along the river is Dajia Riverside Park.

Pollution 
The Keelung River is heavily polluted by both raw sewage and industrial pollution from illegal industry. The restoration of the natural river is on the agenda of the Taipei City Government and several citizen organizations.

Events
During the 1880s, the French general Jacques Duchesne fought the Keelung campaign in the river basin, defeating the Chinese.

On 4 February 2015, TransAsia Airways Flight 235, an ATR-72 operated by TransAsia Airways, crashed into the river, close to the Nanhu Bridge in Taipei, resulting in 43 fatalities and 17 injuries, including two on the ground.

River straightening 
In the second half of the 20th century, the Keelung river has undergone several manmade changes to reduce flooding and accommodate growth of the Taipei. These include straightening of the river's path near the districts of Nangang, Neihu and Shilin.

See also
 Geography of Taiwan
 Keelung Nuannuan pothole

References 

Rivers of Taiwan
Landforms of New Taipei
Landforms of Keelung
Landforms of Taipei